The 2005 GP2 Series season was the thirty-ninth season of the second-tier of Formula One feeder championship and also first season under the GP2 Series moniker. The season started in Imola, Italy on 23 April, and ended in Manama, Bahrain on 30 September. The season was won by the German Nico Rosberg, with the Finn Heikki Kovalainen finishing second.

2005 was the first season of the newly renamed Formula One feeder series, from Formula 3000 to GP2. The inaugural season did not feature reigning F3000 champion Vitantonio Liuzzi, because the Italian was driving for Red Bull Racing in Formula One. The series did feature two former F1 drivers, Italians Gianmaria Bruni and Giorgio Pantano, driving for Coloni and SuperNova respectively.

Season summary
In the opening race at Imola, there were a number of mechanical problems and with organisers afraid of trouble at the start, the rolling start was used in both races despite the weather being dry. Nicolas Lapierre had taken his inaugural pole position but he was out before the race had started due to mechanical problems. The race was won by his team-mate Heikki Kovalainen.

After the first weekend, it was decided that the points for the fastest lap would only be awarded if the driver was classified. This was due to the event in the Imola sprint race, where Lapierre started with a fuel load with which he wouldn't have been able to finish, set a fastest lap and retired soon after.

At Montmeló, the drivers could finally experience standing starts. F1 refugee Bruni won the feature race and José María López the sprint race. The first four races had been won by four drivers in four teams, highlighting that the field had many competitive drivers. Adam Carroll was the first driver to take a second victory after he won at Monaco, where only one race was held.

At Nürburgring, the sprint race was extended from 80 to 120 kilometres. This coincided with F1 dropping its second qualifying session on Sunday morning. The sprint race turned to be one of the most exciting of the season, with Monegasque Clivio Piccione winning.

Heikki Kovalainen was the top driver early in the season, winning three of the first five feature races. However, the season took a turnaround at Magny-Cours, where ART Grand Prix started going strong. Tactical errors caused them to lose the feature race, but Nico Rosberg gave them their first win at the sprint. Rosberg went on to win the next two feature races, while Olivier Pla won both sprints having started from pole position in both of them.

At the qualifying of the Hungaroring race, ART cars were disqualified for illegal position of their steering rack. They were sent to back of the grid but it didn't stop them taking points finishes in the feature and 1-2 in the sprint race, where Alexandre Prémat won his first race. Neel Jani joined the winners' list in the feature race.

Prémat also won the next race at Istanbul, while championship leading duo Kovalainen and Rosberg finished outside the points. The sprint race started in wet conditions but dried out, so tyre changes were necessary. Kovalainen did that move perfectly and won the race having started 10th. Rosberg jumped from 17th to 3rd.

Kovalainen and Jani won races at Monza but Rosberg took the most points with two second places and two fastest laps. Nelson Piquet Jr. then won the feature race at Spa-Francorchamps while Rosberg took the championship lead from Kovalainen who spun off on the last lap while battling for eighth place and pole for Sunday's race. Carroll led the sprint race from the start but following accidents involving Ernesto Viso, Hiroki Yoshimoto and Jani the race was stopped early and only half points were awarded. Viso still ended in 3rd position thanks to countback rule.

The championship was decided in Bahrain which held the only race not supporting F1. Rosberg led Kovalainen by three points and increased his lead by taking pole position. Rosberg also won the race and clinched the title as Kovalainen was 3rd. Rosberg then also won the sprint race, becoming the first driver in the series to win both races during an event.

Teams and drivers
All of the teams used the Dallara GP2/05 chassis with Renault-badged 4.0 litre (244 cu in) naturally-aspirated Mecachrome V8 engines in 2005 in order to keep the field fair.

As this was the inaugural season in the series, car numbers were distributed by a pre-season session held at Circuit Paul Ricard on 6 April. The fastest driver got number 1, his team-mate number 2, next best driver number 3 etc.

Driver changes
 Entering GP2
 Juan Cruz Álvarez: World Series by Nissan (Gabord Competición) → Campos Racing
 Can Artam: International Formula 3000 (Coloni Motorsport & Super Nova Racing) → iSport International
 Gianmaria Bruni: Formula One (Minardi Cosworth) → Coloni Motorsport
 Adam Carroll: British Formula 3 Championship (P1 Racing) → Super Nova International
 Fairuz Fauzy: British Formula 3 Championship (Menu F3 Motorsport & P1 Racing) → DAMS
 Borja García: Spanish Formula Three Championship (Racing Engineering) → Racing Engineering
 Sergio Hernández: Spanish Formula Three Championship (Adrian Campos Motorsport) & World Series by Nissan (Saulnier Racing) → Campos Racing
 Neel Jani: Formula Renault V6 Eurocup (DAMS) → Racing Engineering
 Heikki Kovalainen: World Series by Nissan (Pons Racing) → Arden International
 Mathias Lauda: International Formula 3000 (CMS Performance) & Superfund Euro Formula 3000 (Traini Corse) → Coloni Motorsport
 Nicolas Lapierre: Formula Three Euroseries (Signature) → Arden International
 José María López: International Formula 3000 (CMS Performance) & Formula Renault V6 Eurocup (DAMS) → DAMS
 Ferdinando Monfardini: International Formula 3000 (Spero I.E.) → Durango
 Alexandre Sarnes Negrão: Formula Three Sudamericana (Piquet Sports) → Hitech Piquet Sports
 Giorgio Pantano: Formula One (Jordan Ford) → Super Nova International
 Clivio Piccione: British Formula 3 Championship (Carlin Motorsport) → Durango
 Nelson Piquet Jr.: British Formula 3 Championship (Piquet Sports) → Hitech Piquet Sports
 Olivier Pla: World Series by Nissan (RC Motorsport & Carlin Motorsport) → DPR
 Alexandre Prémat: Formula Three Euroseries (ASM Formule 3) → ART Grand Prix
 Nico Rosberg: Formula Three Euroseries (Team Rosberg) → ART Grand Prix
 Ryan Sharp: Formula Renault V6 Eurocup (Jenzer Motorsport) → DPR
 Scott Speed: Eurocup Formula Renault 2.0 & Formula Renault 2.0 Germany (Motopark Academy) → iSport International
 Toni Vilander: Italian Formula Three Championship (Coloni F3) & Formula Three Euroseries (Coloni F3) → Coloni Motorsport
 Ernesto Viso: [British Formula 3 Championship (P1 Racing) & International Formula 3000 (Durango) → BCN Competición
 Hiroki Yoshimoto: World Series by Nissan (Gabord Competición) → BCN Competición

Midseason changes
 Giorgio Mondini replaced Ryan Sharp for Hungarian races
 Toni Vilander replaced Gianmaria Bruni for Italian races.
 Gianmaria Bruni replaced Ferdinando Monfardini for Belgian races.
 Ferdinando Monfardini replaced Toni Vilander for Bahrain races.

Calendar
There were 23 races in the 2005 GP2 Series championship at 12 different circuits. Eleven race weekends had one race on Saturday and another on Sunday, the exception being the race at Circuit de Monaco where there was only one race on the weekend. The season began on 23 April 2005 and concluded on 25 September 2005.

The calendar was as follows:

Results

Championship standings
Scoring system
Points are awarded to the top 8 classified finishers in the Feature race, and to the top 6 classified finishers in the Sprint race. The pole-sitter in the feature race will also receive two points, and two points are given to the driver who set the fastest lap in the feature and sprint races. The driver also has to drive 90% of race laps. No extra points are awarded to the pole-sitter in the sprint race.

Feature race points

Sprint race points
Points are awarded to the top 6 classified finishers.

Drivers' Championship

Notes:
 – Drivers did not finish the race, but were classified as they completed more than 90% of the race distance.
 – Sprint race at Spa was stopped early and half points were awarded.

Teams' Championship

Notes

References

External links

GP2 Series & GP2 Asia Series
Results at autosport.com
Results at sportresultaten.be

GP2 Series season 2005
GP2 Series seasons
GP2 Series